O Presidente Negro ou O Choque das Raças (The Black President, or the Racial Shock) is a 1926 science fiction novel by the Brazilian writer Monteiro Lobato.

Plot
Most of the action of the book takes place in the United States in 2228. In this world, racial intermingling is prohibited so that blacks and whites remain genetically pure. During the 2228 presidential election, the white male incumbent president, Kerlog, runs against a white feminist named Evelyn Astor. The black leader James Roy Wilde (Jim Roy) postpones his support for either candidate until one hour before the election, when he declares that he is a candidate. He wins in the 30-minute electronic voting, becoming the  United States' 88th and first black president. However, the American whites plot to sterilize all blacks. Roy is found dead in his office, and then Kerlog wins in a re-election.

Recent interest in the novel
After being out of print for forty years, O Presidente Negro was re-issued by the Brazilian publisher Editora Globo in March 2008, when Barack Obama's presidential campaign in the United States revived interest in the work. The book was advertised with the disclaimer, "Any resemblance to actual events is pure coincidence."

References

External link

1926 science fiction novels
Novels about elections
Brazilian science fiction novels
Sterilization in fiction
Novels set in the 23rd century